Timer coalescing is a computer system energy-saving technique that reduces central processing unit (CPU) power consumption by reducing the precision of software timers used for synchronization of process wake-ups, minimizing the number of times the CPU is forced to perform the relatively power-costly operation of entering and exiting idle states.

Implementations of timer coalescing  
The Linux kernel gained support for deferrable timers in 2.6.22, and controllable "timer slack" for threads in 2.6.28 allowing timer coalescing.
Timer coalescing has been a feature of Microsoft Windows from Windows 7 onward.
Apple's XNU kernel based OS X gained support as of OS X Mavericks.
FreeBSD supports it since September 2010.

See also 

 Advanced Configuration and Power Interface (ACPI)
 Advanced Programmable Interrupt Controller (APIC)
 High Precision Event Timer (HPET)
 HLT (x86 instruction)
 Interrupt coalescing
 Programmable interval timer
 Time Stamp Counter (TSC)

References 

Operating system kernels
Synchronization